Hyalinobatrachium is a genus of glass frogs, family Centrolenidae. They are widely distributed in the Americas, from tropical Mexico to southeastern Brazil and Argentina.

Taxonomy and systematics
The genus is currently defined to include Hyalinobatrachium fleischmanni and its closest relatives. Its sister taxon is Celsiella. Some species formerly in this genus are now in Vitreorana or Teratohyla.

Description
Hyalinobatrachium have a bulbous liver covered by white pigment, a transparent parietal peritoneum, and lack a humeral spine in adult males. The bones are white in living animals. Males usually call from the underside of leaves. Females deposit one layer of eggs on the underside of leaves.

Species
As of March 2022, these species are included in the genus:
 Hyalinobatrachium adespinosai Guayasamin, Vieira, Glor, and Hutter, 2019
 Hyalinobatrachium anachoretus Twomey, Delia, and Castroviejo-Fisher, 2014
 Hyalinobatrachium aureoguttatum (Barrera-Rodriguez and Ruiz-Carranza, 1989)
 Hyalinobatrachium bergeri (Cannatella, 1980)
 Hyalinobatrachium cappellei (Van Lidth de Jeude, 1904)
 Hyalinobatrachium carlesvilai Castroviejo-Fisher, Padial, Chaparro, Aguayo-Vedia, and De la Riva, 2009
 Hyalinobatrachium chirripoi (Taylor, 1958)
 Hyalinobatrachium colymbiphyllum (Taylor, 1949)
 Hyalinobatrachium dianae Kubicki, Salazar, and Puschendorf, 2015
 Hyalinobatrachium duranti (Rivero, 1985)
 Hyalinobatrachium esmeralda Ruiz-Carranza and Lynch, 1998
 Hyalinobatrachium fleischmanni (Boettger, 1893)
 Hyalinobatrachium fragile (Rivero, 1985)
 Hyalinobatrachium guairarepanense Señaris, 2001
 Hyalinobatrachium iaspidiense (Ayarzagüena, 1992)
 Hyalinobatrachium ibama Ruiz-Carranza and Lynch, 1998
 Hyalinobatrachium kawense Castroviejo-Fisher, Vilà, Ayarzagüena, Blanc, and Ernst, 2011
 Hyalinobatrachium mashpi Guayasamin, Brunner, Valencia-Aguilar, Franco-Mena, Ringler, Armijos, Morochz, Bustamante, Maynard & Culebras, 2022
 Hyalinobatrachium mesai Barrio-Amorós and Brewer-Carias, 2008
 Hyalinobatrachium mondolfii Señaris and Ayarzagüena, 2001
 Hyalinobatrachium muiraquitan Oliveira and Hernández-Ruz, 2017
 Hyalinobatrachium munozorum (Lynch and Duellman, 1973)
 Hyalinobatrachium nouns Guayasamin, Brunner, Valencia-Aguilar, Franco-Mena, Ringler, Armijos, Morochz, Bustamante, Maynard & Culebras, 2022
 Hyalinobatrachium orientale (Rivero, 1968)
 Hyalinobatrachium orocostale (Rivero, 1968)
 Hyalinobatrachium pallidum (Rivero, 1985)
 Hyalinobatrachium pellucidum (Lynch and Duellman, 1973)
 Hyalinobatrachium talamancae (Taylor, 1952)
 Hyalinobatrachium tatayoi Castroviejo-Fisher, Ayarzagüena, and Vilà, 2007
 Hyalinobatrachium taylori (Goin, 1968)
 Hyalinobatrachium tricolor Castroviejo-Fisher, Vilà, Ayarzagüena, Blanc, and Ernst, 2011
 Hyalinobatrachium valerioi (Dunn, 1931)
 Hyalinobatrachium vireovittatum (Starrett and Savage, 1973)
 Hyalinobatrachium viridissimum (Taylor, 1942)
 Hyalinobatrachium yaku Guayasamin, Cisneros-Heredia, Maynard, Lynch, Culebras, and Hamilton, 2017

References

 
Glass frogs
Amphibian genera
Amphibians of Central America
Amphibians of South America
Taxa named by John Douglas Lynch